Prasanna Jayakody (In Sinhalese: ප්‍රසන්න ජයකොඩි) is a Sri Lankan film director and screenwriter, internationally recognized for his cinematic accomplishments in contemporary Sri Lankan cinema. His movies primarily explore the human state of mind. They are fusions of human emotions, senses and thoughts set against the fractured socio-economic, cultural and religious environments of Sri Lanka. In the global context, Jayakody’s cinema represents the psycho-biological realities of mankind and arbitrariness of human cognition juxtaposed against the larger concept of civilization. Jayakody’s eccentric cinematic world, in the absence of a flowing story, capitalizes on subtle but detailed images and intense characters.

Early life and career
Jayakody, born on 25 August 1968, in Horana, embarked on a journey of artistic expression with his excellent skills in painting. He gained his first international award from the government of Japan, winning an Art competition while he was still at school. Art, being the base of his visual reading, Jayakody cherishes the memory of drawing cover page vectors for his late father Jayasena Jayakody; a celebrated, award-winning author who has showcased three State Literary Awards in the Best Sinhala Novel category.

He completed his education from Taxila Central College, Horana. Following a series of short dramas, Jayakody stunned the structured traditional Sri Lankan theater in 1993 with his debut Sevenali Saha Minissu (Shadows and Men), an absurd drama which dealt with the complexities of the human condition, and realities of life. It won the gifted young dramatist, 21 years of age at the time, the Best Stage Drama award in the State Drama Festival in Sri Lanka that year.

After challenging the conventional Sri Lankan theater, Jayakody then turned to excel in the Sri Lankan Television Drama genre with his exceptional works of art; Nisala Vila (The Still Pond) in 1999, Imadiyamankada (At the Crossing) in 2000, Sanda Amawakayi (The Moon Eclipsed) in 2002, and Hada Vila Sakmana in 2003. These dramas secured several state awards, including the Best Tele Drama of the Year. Jayakody’s Awasana Horawa (The Final Hour) in 1998 won the Best Young Director award at the Sumathi Tele Awards.

Filmography
His first film direction came through Sankara in 2007. The film won several awards in both local and international award festivals, including the Silver Pyramid award at the Cairo International Film Festival that same year.
The film also showcased awards for the Best Debut Director and the NETPAC Award for the Best Asian Film at the Kerala International Film Festival in the same year. Sankara also secured the Jury special prize at the Turkey Silk Road Film Festival. His next movie Karma, which came in 2013, was nominated for several international awards. Jayakody’s third cinematic expression 28 was named the Best Asian Film at the Amsterdam Film Awards in 2014. The film 28 also received the Best Director and the Best Actor awards at the SAARC Film Festival in 2018.

 No. denotes the Number of Sri Lankan film in the Sri Lankan cinema.

Sankara (Introspection)

Jayakody’s debut movie Sankara features a young Buddhist monk, Ananda, who visits a temple to restore the frescoes. Following several incidents, the young monk meets a beautiful woman who stirs his innermost worldly desires that a monk is prohibited to entertain. The movie reels out the internal turmoil the protagonist undergoes while trying to restore the frescoes; a task that ironically demands full concentration and inner peace. Sankara encompasses a deep philosophical and psychological portrayal of the complexities of the human mindset. The young Buddhist monk is thrown into a situation where his restrained self is in conflict with his innermost raw sexual desires. From a psychological approach, the protagonist suffers from anxiety, which arises with the conflict between his sensuous desires for the girl and the fact that he should restrain himself as a monk.

Karma

Jayakody’s next film Karma (2010) is a plethora of emotions woven together into a microscopic image of three lives interconnected for all peculiar reasons. The movie deals with a young man, Piyal, 23, suffering from the guilt of his mother’s death, who ultimately finds solace in attending to his neighbor, a 32 year old woman who is diagnosed with cancer. Piyal’s initial curiosity about the girl, wheels into a sexual attraction and then finally into empathy. He attempts to redeem himself from the guilt of his mother’s death by attending to the sick woman. Her inattentive lover learns that Piyal has taken care of his girlfriend and embraces a similar kind of guilt that Piyal was suffering from. Concentrating on the dualities of life, the movie takes the viewer through emotional turbulence.

28

In 28, (2014) country bumpkins Abasiri and Mani won't say no to a trip to Colombo, even if the occasion is a sad one: they have to bring back the corpse of a woman from their village. When Abasiri learns the identity of the woman, the mood changes—and the problems begin. The standard method of using an undertaker would cost too much, so in the end, it has to be an ice cream van and its unwitting driver that transports the coffin through the breath-taking Sri Lankan landscape. Layer by layer, this melancholic road movie gains depth, uncovering social chasms, but without losing its light touch.

Awards and Accolades

Sankara 
 Cairo International Film Festival – 2006 – Silver Pyramid Award for Best Director 
 International Film Festival of Kerala – 2006 – Silver Crow Pheasant
 International Film Festival of Kerala – 2006 – NETPAC Award 
 Bursa Festival – 2007 – Special Jury Mention 
 Dhaka International Film Festival – 2008 – FIPRESCI Prize

28
 NETPAC Award (Won) at the International Film Festival Rotterdam (IFFR) (2014) Rotterdam, Netherlands 
 Special Jury Mention at the Bled Film Festival (2014), Bled, Slovenia 
 Award for the Best Director (Won) at the SAARC Film Festival 2018
 Award for the Best Actor (Won) by Mahendra Perera at the SAARC Film Festival 2018
 Asia Pacific Screen Award (Nominated) for Best Screen Play 
 Asia Pacific Screen Award (Nominated) Mahendra Perera for Best Performance by an actor 
 Award for the Best Film (Won) at the Derana Film Festival 2018
 Award for the Best Director (Won) at the Derana Film Festival 2018 and Hiru Golden Awards 2018 
 Award for the Best Screen Play (Won) at the Derana Film Festival 2018
 Award for the Best Actor (Nominated) and Best Actor in a Supportive Role (Nominated) at the Derana Film Festival 2018
 Sarasavi Film Festival 2017 (Won) awards for Best Film, Best Director, Best Script, Best Camera, and Best Editor

Karma
International Participation:
 Pusan International Film Festival in South Korea
 São Paulo International Film Festival in Brazil
 Rotterdam International Film Festival in the Netherlands
 Chicago International Film Festival
 Bildrausch International Film Festival in Switzerland
 Marrakech International Film Festival in Morocco
 Isolacinema International Film Festival in Slovenia

References

External links
 
 28: Mortal fears, immortal emotions

1968 births
Sri Lankan film directors
Living people